The Verizon Building is an office and residential building at 140 West Street in Lower Manhattan, New York City.

Verizon Building may also refer to:
 Verizon Building (1095 Avenue of the Americas)
 Verizon Building (Pearl Street) or 375 Pearl Street or One Brooklyn Bridge Plaza
 Verizon Building (Pittsburgh)  or Bell Telephone Company of Pennsylvania Western Headquarters Building